Malaya Vilva is a rural locality (a village) in Alexandrovskoye Urban Settlement, Alexandrovsky District, Perm Krai, Russia. The population was 4 as of 2010. There are 2 streets.

Geography 
Malaya Vilva is located 15 km southwest of Alexandrovsk (the district's administrative centre) by road. Ust-Lytva is the nearest rural locality.

References 

Rural localities in Alexandrovsky District